Aznau may refer to:
 Aznau, Hamadan
 Aznau, Zanjan